Geastrum (orthographical variant Geaster) is a genus of puffball-like mushrooms in the family Geastraceae. Many species are known commonly as earthstars.

The name, which comes from geo meaning earth and  meaning star, refers to the behavior of the outer peridium. At maturity, the outer layer of the fruiting body splits into segments which turn outward creating a star-like pattern on the ground. The inner peridium is called a spore sac. In some species, the outer peridium splits from a middle layer, causing the spore sac to arch off the ground. If the outer peridium opens when wet and closes when dry, it is described as hygroscopic.

In some species, the inner peridium is borne on a stalk or pedicel. The columella is a column-like clump of sterile tissue found inside the inner peridium. The network of fertile tissue inside the inner peridium, the capillitium, arises from the columella And is where basidia and basidiospores are produced. The mouth in most species of "earth-stars" is quite prominent, often arising as a small cone at the apex of the inner peridium. It may be even or sulcate (grooved).

They are generally not toxic but considered non-edible due to their fibrous texture in the mature stage at which they are generally found.

Species
Although the Dictionary of the Fungi (2008) estimated roughly 50 species in Geastrum, a more recent estimate (2014) suggests that there may be up to 120 species. Geastrum coronatum Pers. has been proposed as the conserved type for the genus. Some similar species that are otherwise difficult to differentiate using classical morphological features (such as G. triplex, G. saccatum, and G. lageniforme) can be identified using chemical spot tests that detect phenoloxidase enzymatic activity, a
differences in the crystal structure of calcium oxalate deposits or DNA sequences. Species include:

 Geastrum aculeatum
 Geastrum albonigrum
 Geastrum andrewsii
 Geastrum argentatum
 Geastrum argentinum
 Geastrum australe
 Geastrum austrominimum
 Geastrum benitoi
 Geastrum britannicum
 Geastrum berkeleyi
 Geastrum bushnellii
 Geastrum campestre
 Geastrum clelandii
 Geastrum congolense
 Geastrum corollinum
 Geastrum coronatum
 Geastrum dissimile
 Geastrum drummondii
 Geastrum dubowskii
 Geastrum echinulatum
 Geastrum elegans
 Geastrum elliptice
 Geastrum entomophilum
 Geastrum episcopale
 Geastrum fimbriatum
 Geastrum flexuosum
 Geastrum floriforme
 Geastrum fornicatum
 Geastrum fuscogleba
 Geastrum hieronymi
 Geastrum hirsutum
 Geastrum huneckii
 Geastrum hungaricum
 Geastrum inpaense – Brazil
 Geastrum kotlabae
 Geastrum kuharii
 Geastrum lageniforme
 Geastrum leptospermum
 Geastrum lilloi
 Geastrum litchiforme
 Geastrum lloydianum
 Geastrum magnosporum
 Geastrum melanocephalum
 Geastrum meridionale
 Geastrum minimum
 Geastrum mirabile
 Geastrum morganii
 Geastrum ovalisporum
 Geastrum oxylobum
 Geastrum papinuttii
 Geastrum parvisporum
 Geastrum parvistriatum
 Geastrum pectinatum
 Geastrum pleosporus
 Geastrum pouzarii
 Geastrum pseudolimbatum
 Geastrum quadrifidum
 Geastrum reticulatum
 Geastrum rhizophorum
 Geastrum rufescens
 Geastrum rugulosum
 Geastrum rusticum – Brazil
 Geastrum saccatum
 Geastrum schmidelii
 Geastrum schweinitzii
 Geastrum senoretiae
 Geastrum setiferum
 Geastrum smardae
 Geastrum smithii
 Geastrum stiptatum
 Geastrum striatum
 Geastrum subiculosum
 Geastrum tichifer
 Geastrum triplex
 Geastrum velutinum
 Geastrum verrucoramulosum
 Geastrum welwitschii
 Geastrum xerophilum
 Geastrum xylogenum

References

Sources 
 New Zealand Species
 British Species
 Czech Species and Photos
 
 
 Ponce de Leon, Patricio, A Revision of the Family Geastraceae, Field Museum of Natural History 1968
 
 

 
Agaricomycetes genera